Liza Andriyani (born 12 February 1979) is an Indonesian former tennis player. She made her debut as a professional in May 1993, aged 14, at the Indonesia Open, a then-Tier IV WTA Tour event.

In 1995 and 1996, she appeared in several Grand Slam Junior Championships. Her best result at that level was reaching the 1995 US Open Junior Championships, where she and Tamarine Tanasugarn reached the semifinals.

She was part of the Indonesia Fed Cup team in 1996, 1997, 1999, and 2004. She has a win–loss record of 0–8.

At the 2002 Asian Games, Andriyani also was part of Indonesia's successful women's tennis team.

In 2008, she returned to professional tennis after an absence of four years. With partner Ayu-Fani Damayanti, she won the women's doubles title at the inaugural Garuda Indonesia Tennis Masters.

ITF Circuit finals

Singles: 7 (4 titles, 3 runner-ups)

Doubles: 21 (14 titles, 7 runner-ups)

References

External links
 
 
 

Indonesian female tennis players
1979 births
Living people
Tennis players at the 1998 Asian Games
Tennis players at the 2002 Asian Games
Asian Games medalists in tennis
Sportspeople from Jakarta
Asian Games gold medalists for Indonesia
Asian Games bronze medalists for Indonesia
Medalists at the 1998 Asian Games
Medalists at the 2002 Asian Games
Southeast Asian Games gold medalists for Indonesia
Southeast Asian Games silver medalists for Indonesia
Southeast Asian Games bronze medalists for Indonesia
Southeast Asian Games medalists in tennis
Competitors at the 1999 Southeast Asian Games